Bohola is a village in County Mayo, Ireland located along the N5 national primary road. It is in the barony of Gallen and gives its name to the parish of Bohola. The village's amenities include two pubs, a post office and a Catholic church.

Sport
The local Gaelic football team is "Bohola Moy Davitts", an amalgamated team consisting of Straide, Foxford and Bohola. Among the team's achievements are its "Feile Doire 2010" All-Ireland title.

Popular culture
Brendan Shine wrote a song called Three Pubs in Bohola. The three pubs listed by Shine were MacDonald's, Clarke's and Roche's. Since the song was written, Clarke's has closed and Roche's is now "The Village Inn".

People
Martin Sheridan, born in Bohola in 1881, he participated in track and field during the St. Louis, Athens and London Olympiads in the early 20th century.
William O'Dwyer, former mayor of New York City and US ambassador to Mexico.
Paul O'Dwyer, brother of William, a lawyer, and politician.
Frank Durkan, civil rights attorney and nephew of the O'Dwyer brothers.
John Mountney, Dundalk F.C. player hails from the village.

See also
 List of towns and villages in Ireland

References

External links
Bohola, County Mayo
Index of 96 of the 1,391 memorials in Bohola Cemetery
Index of Bohola Cemetery (St Josephs), County Mayo
Index of Bohola Old Cemetery, County Mayo

Towns and villages in County Mayo